Property dualism describes a category of positions in the philosophy of mind which hold that, although the world is composed of just one kind of substance—the physical kind—there exist two distinct kinds of properties: physical properties and mental properties. In other words, it is the view that non-physical, mental properties (such as thoughts, imagination and memories) exist in, or naturally supervene upon, certain physical substances (namely brains).

Substance dualism, on the other hand, is the view that there exist in the universe two fundamentally different kinds of substance: physical (matter) and non-physical (mind or consciousness), and subsequently also two kinds of properties which inhere in those respective substances. Substance dualism is thus more susceptible to the mind–body problem. Both substance and property dualism are opposed to reductive physicalism.

Non-reductive physicalism

Non-reductive physicalism is the predominant contemporary form of property dualism according to which mental properties are mapped to neurobiological properties, but are not reducible to them. Non-reductive physicalism asserts that mind is not ontologically reducible to matter, in that an ontological distinction lies in the differences between the properties of mind and matter. It asserts that while mental states are physical in that they are caused by physical states, they are not ontologically reducible to physical states. No mental state is the same one thing as some physical state, nor is any mental state composed merely from physical states and phenomena.

Emergent materialism

Emergentism is the idea that increasingly complex structures in the world give rise to the "emergence" of novel properties that are something over and above (i.e. cannot be reduced to) their more basic constituents (see Supervenience).  The concept of emergence dates back to the late 19th century. John Stuart Mill notably argued for an emergentist conception of science in his 1843 work A System of Logic.

Applied to the mind/body relation, emergent materialism is another way of describing the non-reductive physicalist conception of the mind that asserts that when matter is organized in the appropriate way (i.e., organized in the way that living human bodies are organized), mental properties emerge.

Anomalous monism

Many contemporary non-reductive physicalists subscribe to a position called anomalous monism (or something very similar to it). Unlike epiphenomenalism, which renders mental properties causally redundant, anomalous monists believe that mental properties make a causal difference to the world. The position was originally put forward by Donald Davidson in his 1970 paper Mental Events, which stakes an identity claim between mental and physical tokens based on the notion of supervenience.

Biological naturalism

Another argument for non-reductive physicalism has been expressed by John Searle, who is the advocate of a distinctive form of physicalism he calls biological naturalism. His view is that although mental states are not ontologically reducible to physical states, they are causally reducible (see causality). He believes the mental will ultimately be explained through neuroscience. This worldview does not necessarily fall under property dualism, and therefore does not necessarily make him a "property dualist". He has acknowledged that "to many people" his views and those of property dualists look a lot alike. But he thinks the comparison is misleading.

Epiphenomenalism 

Epiphenomenalism is a doctrine about mental-physical causal relations which holds that one or more mental states and their properties are the by-products (or epiphenomena) of the states of a closed physical system, and are not causally reducible to physical states (do not have any influence on physical states). According to this view mental properties are as such real constituents of the world, but they are causally impotent; while physical causes give rise to mental properties like sensations, volition, ideas, etc., such mental phenomena themselves cause nothing further - they are causal dead ends.

The position is credited to English biologist Thomas Huxley (Huxley 1874), who analogised mental properties to the whistle on a steam locomotive. The position found favour amongst scientific behaviourists over the next few decades, until behaviourism itself fell to the cognitive revolution in the 1960s. Recently, epiphenomenalism has gained popularity with those struggling to reconcile non-reductive physicalism and mental causation.

Epiphenomenal qualia

In the paper "Epiphenomenal Qualia" and later "What Mary Didn't Know" Frank Jackson made the so-called knowledge argument against physicalism. The thought experiment was originally proposed by Jackson as follows:

Jackson continued:

Panpsychist property dualism

Panpsychism is the view that all matter has a mental aspect, or, alternatively, all objects have a unified center of experience or point of view. Superficially, it seems to be a form of property dualism, since
it regards everything as having both mental and physical properties. However, some panpsychists say that mechanical behaviour is derived from the primitive mentality of atoms and molecules — as are sophisticated mentality and organic behaviour, the difference being attributed to the presence or absence of complex structure in a compound object. So long as the reduction of non-mental properties to mental ones is in place, panpsychism is not strictly a form of property dualism; otherwise it is.

David Chalmers has expressed sympathy for panpsychism (or a modified variant, panprotopsychism) as a possible resolution to the hard problem of consciousness, though he regards the combination problem as an important obstacle for the theory. Other philosophers who have taken interest in the view include Thomas Nagel, Galen Strawson, Timothy Sprigge, William Seager, and Philip Goff.

Other proponents

Saul Kripke
Kripke has a well-known argument for some kind of property dualism. Using the concept of rigid designators, he states that if dualism is logically possible, then it is the case.

Subjective idealism

Subjective idealism, proposed in the eighteenth century by George Berkeley, is an ontic doctrine that directly opposes materialism or physicalism. It does not admit ontic property dualism, but does admit epistemic property dualism. It is rarely advocated by philosophers nowadays.

See also 
 Physicalism
 Functionalism (philosophy of mind)
 Qualia
 "What Is It Like to Be a Bat?"
 Explanatory gap
 Chinese room

Notes

References
 
 Davidson, D. (1970) "Mental Events", in Actions and Events, Oxford: Clarendon Press, 1980
 Huxley, Thomas. (1874) "On the Hypothesis that Animals are Automata, and its History", The Fortnightly Review, n.s. 16, pp. 555–580. Reprinted in Method and Results: Essays by Thomas H. Huxley (New York: D. Appleton and Company, 1898)
 Jackson, F. (1982) "Epiphenomenal Qualia", The Philosophical Quarterly 32: 127-136.
 Kim, Jaegwon. (1993) "Supervenience and Mind", Cambridge: Cambridge University Press.
 MacLaughlin, B. (1992) "The Rise and Fall of British Emergentism", in Beckerman, et al. (eds), Emergence or Reduction?, Berlin: De Gruyter.
 Mill, John Stuart (1843). "System of Logic". London: Longmans, Green, Reader, and Dyer. [8th ed., 1872].

External links 
 M. D. Robertson: Dualism vs. Materialism: A Response to Paul Churchland
 Stanford Encyclopedia of Philosophy: Dualism
 Stanford Encyclopedia of Philosophy: Epiphenomenalism
 Stanford Encyclopedia of Philosophy: Physicalism
 The Argument from Physical Minds

Metaphysics of mind
Dualism (philosophy of mind)
Theory of mind
Emergence